Scarab Peak is a  mountain summit located on the Continental Divide, on the shared border between Banff and Kootenay national parks in Canada. Scarab Peak is part of the Ball Range in the Canadian Rockies. The mountain's name scarab was in keeping with the Egyptian theme of the immediate area, e.g., Egypt Lake, Mummy Lake, Pharaoh Peaks, names which were applied in 1922 by Arthur O. Wheeler of the Interprovincial Boundary Survey. Wheeler regarded the area particularly beautiful when he wrote: "After 30 years of exploration, surveys and mapping the main ranges of the Canadian Rockies, the writer ... can safely say that outstanding among them for scenic charm and interest may be classed the group of peaks, lakes and alpine meadows of the Egypt Lake area."

Geology

Like other mountains in Banff Park, Scarab Peak is composed of sedimentary rock laid down during the Precambrian to Jurassic periods. Formed in shallow seas, this sedimentary rock was pushed east and over the top of younger rock during the Laramide orogeny.

Climate

Based on the Köppen climate classification, Scarab Peak is located in a subarctic climate zone with cold, snowy winters, and mild summers. Winter temperatures can drop below −20 °C with wind chill factors below −30 °C.

References

External links
 Parks Canada web site: Banff National Park
 Parks Canada web site: Kootenay National Park

Two-thousanders of Alberta
Two-thousanders of British Columbia
Canadian Rockies
Mountains of Banff National Park